Aqa Baqer (also Romanized as Āqā Bāqer; also known as Qaşşāb Tappeh) is a village in Sharqi Rural District, in the Central District of Ardabil County, Ardabil Province, Iran. At the 2006 census, its population was 1,266, in 316 families.

References 

Towns and villages in Ardabil County